Yemenis in Pakistan are residents of Pakistan who are of Yemeni descent.

Demographics
Over 5,000 expatriates from the Yemeni city of Aden reside in Karachi. There are also over a hundred Yemeni international students pursuing higher education in different universities in Pakistan. They include 40 Yemeni pupils studying on scholarships provided by the Government of Pakistan. In addition, some Yemenis in Pakistan are reported to have been militants operating for insurgent networks in the northwestern tribal areas on the Afghan border.

There is an embassy of Yemen in Islamabad which provides services to Yemeni citizens in Pakistan. The embassy along with the Yemeni community observes various national and cultural events such as Unity Day.

Notable people
 Annie Khalid, singer and model

See also

 Pakistanis in Yemen
 Pakistan–Yemen relations

References

Arab diaspora in Pakistan
 
Immigration to Pakistan
Pakistan
Pakistan